Christopher A. Walsh (1944-) is the Bullard Professor of Neurology at Harvard Medical School, Chief of the Division of Genetics at Children's Hospital Boston, Investigator of the Howard Hughes Medical Institute, and the former Director of the Harvard-MIT MD-PhD Program.  His research focuses on genetics of human cortical development and somatic mutations contributions to human brain diseases.

Walsh was a founding Board Member of the International Center for Genetic Disease (iCGD) at Brigham and Women's Hospital, Harvard Medical School, which focuses on the analysis of patients and healthy subjects from different parts of the world for genetics research into human disease and health.

Early life and education
Walsh earned his B.S degree in chemistry from Bucknell University in 1978. He went on to graduate school at the University of Chicago, where he earned his MD (1985) and Ph.D. (1983) in life science in 1988 with Ray Guillery.

Career
Walsh completed a postdoctoral fellowship at Harvard Medical School in 1993 with Constance Cepko, and later that year joined the faculty at Harvard Medical School as a professor of genetics, where he remains to this day. Walsh has authored more than 350 publications in scholarly journals and trained several graduate students and postdoctoral researchers. In 2018 Walsh was elected to the National Academy of Sciences. In 2021 he received the Gruber Prize in Neuroscience (shared with Christine Petit) and in 2022 he was awarded the Kavli Prize in Neuroscience.

Notable publications

References

External links
 Walsh et al publications on Pubmed

Living people
Harvard Medical School faculty
Howard Hughes Medical Investigators
Bucknell University alumni
Pritzker School of Medicine alumni
Year of birth missing (living people)
Members of the United States National Academy of Sciences
Fellows of the American Academy of Arts and Sciences
Members of the National Academy of Medicine